Lucius Cluentius was a general of the Pompeiian forces. Lucius Cluentius, called Aulus Cluentius by Eutropius, was one of the Italian generals during the Social War. He commanded the Pompeiian troops against Sulla, and was at first victorious, but was subsequently defeated by Sulla in 89 BC. He, along with 20,000 of his men were killed after being chased to the walls of Nola, having been refused entry by its inhabitants.

References 

1st-century BC Romans
89 BC deaths
Year of birth unknown
Ancient Roman generals
Roman generals killed in action
Cluentii